Pushover or Push Over may refer to:
 Pushover EP, by Australian singer Lisa Miller
 Pushover (film), a 1954 film noir starring Fred MacMurray
 Pushover (video game), a 1992 game from Ocean
 Pushover analysis, a type of seismic analysis
 "Push Over", a segment game from The Price Is Right
 "Pushover", a song by Etta James from the 1963 album Etta James Top Ten
 "Pushover", a song by The Long Winters from the 2006 album Putting the Days to Bed
 Pushover try, a try scored from a set-piece scrum in rugby union; see Scrum (rugby union)#Awarding
 Push Over (band), an American post-hardcore band